Hannah McKinney is the former vice-mayor and mayor of Kalamazoo, Michigan. She was elected mayor on November 8, 2005, after previously serving since 1997 as the vice-mayor under the late Robert Jones. McKinney was mayor at the time that the Kalamazoo Promise was announced, and was also mayor when Kalamazoo's Intermodal Center was dedicated.  The current mayor, Bobby J. Hopewell, was elected November 13, 2007, edging McKinney by just 54 votes. She automatically became vice mayor. McKinney served eight terms on the Kalamazoo City Commission before deciding not to run again in 2011. She served as a city planning commissioner prior to her election to the city commission. She is also a full professor of economics at Kalamazoo College and is the Thomas K. Kreilick Professor of Economics and Business.

McKinney received her Ph.D. in economics at the University of Pennsylvania. She has been teaching at Kalamazoo College since 1989.  Her focus is in urban economics, urban planning and public finance.  She has also written a book entitled The Development of Local Public Services, 1650–1869:  Lessons from Middletown, CT., published by Greenwood Press, 1995.  She has also written several articles on the topics of urban planning and public finance. McKinney has two children, Charlie and Maggie, and a grandson, Aiden.

References

Living people
Mayors of Kalamazoo, Michigan
Women mayors of places in Michigan
Year of birth missing (living people)
University of Pennsylvania alumni
Kalamazoo College faculty
American women academics
21st-century American women